The 1968 Princeton Tigers football team was an American football team that represented Princeton University during the 1968 NCAA University Division football season. Princeton finished fourth in the Ivy League.

In their 12th and final year under head coach Dick Colman, the Tigers compiled a 4–5 record and outscored opponents 228 to 149. Richard R. Bracken was the team captain.

Princeton's 4–3 conference record placed fourth in the Ivy League standings. The Tigers outscored Ivy opponents 207 to 115.

Princeton played its home games at Palmer Stadium on the university campus in Princeton, New Jersey.

Schedule

References

Princeton
Princeton Tigers football seasons
Princeton Tigers football